Dark Horse Entertainment is a motion picture and television production arm of American comic book publishing company Dark Horse Comics, founded in 1992. They also have a sub-label, Dark Horse Indie. They have their headquarters in Milwaukie, Oregon.

Productions

Series
The following are Dark Horse Entertainment TV projects based on Dark Horse comic books:

Series based on Dark Horse Comics publications
The Mask: Animated Series (1995–1997, animated series)
Timecop (1997–1998)
Big Guy and Rusty the Boy Robot (1999–2001, animated series)
Dark Matter (2015–2017)
The Umbrella Academy (2019–present)
Resident Alien (2021–present)
Samurai Rabbit: The Usagi Chronicles (2022–present, animated series)
Grendel (TBA)
Mind MGMT (TBA)
She Could Fly (TBA)
Wyrd (TBA)

Series not based on Dark Horse Comics publications
Coyote (2021)
Revenge Inc. (TBA)

Films
The following are feature films based on series from Dark Horse Comics:

Films based on Dark Horse Comics publications
The Mask (1994)
Timecop (1994)
Enemy (1996)
Barb Wire (1996)
Virus (1999)
Mystery Men (1999)
American Splendor (2003)
Timecop 2: The Berlin Decision (2003)
Hellboy (2004)
Son of the Mask (2005)
Hellboy II: The Golden Army (2008)
R.I.P.D. (2013)
Polar (2019)
Hellboy (2019)
R.I.P.D. 2: Rise of the Damned (2022)
Bang! (TBA)
 Dept. H (TBA)
 Hellboy: The Crooked Man (TBA)
 Lady Killer (TBA)
 Mystery Girl (TBA)
 The Goon (TBA, animated film)

Films not based on Dark Horse Comics publications
Dr. Giggles (1992)
My Name Is Bruce (2007)
30 Days of Night (2007)

Bill Russell: Legend (2023)

Dark Horse Indie
Monarch of the Moon (2005)
Splinter (2006)
Driftwood (2006)
Mr. Warmth: The Don Rickles Project (2007)

See also
Dark Horse Comics
List of television series and films based on Dark Horse Comics publications
List of unproduced Dark Horse Comics projects

References

External links 
 

Dark Horse Comics
1992 establishments in Oregon
American companies established in 1992
Film production companies of the United States
Television production companies of the United States
Mass media companies established in 1992
Companies based in Milwaukie, Oregon
Embracer Group